The Memphis Tigers football statistical leaders are individual statistical leaders of the Memphis Tigers football program in various categories, including passing, rushing, receiving, total offense, defensive stats, and kicking. Within those areas, the lists identify single-game, single-season, and career leaders. The Tigers represent the University of Memphis in the NCAA's American Athletic Conference.

Although Memphis began competing in intercollegiate football in 1912, the school's official record book considers the "modern era" to have begun in 1947. Records from before this year are often incomplete and inconsistent, and they are generally not included in these lists.

These lists are dominated by more recent players for several reasons:
 Since 1947, seasons have increased from 10 games to 11 and then 12 games in length.
 The NCAA didn't allow freshmen to play varsity football until 1972 (with the exception of the World War II years), allowing players to have four-year careers.
 Bowl games only began counting toward single-season and career statistics in 2002. The Tigers have played in eight bowl games since this decision, with a ninth now assured in 2018, giving many recent players an extra game to accumulate statistics.
 The Tigers have played in the American Championship Game twice, in 2017 and 2018. Normally, this gives players in those seasons yet another game to accumulate statistics. However, the Tigers were unable to play one of their originally scheduled games in 2017 due to disruptions resulting from Hurricane Irma.

These lists are updated through the 2018 American Championship Game.

Passing

Passing yards

Passing touchdowns

Rushing

Rushing yards

Rushing touchdowns

Receiving

Receptions

Receiving yards

Receiving touchdowns

Total offense
Total offense is the sum of passing and rushing statistics. It does not include receiving or returns.

Total offense yards

Total touchdowns

Defense

Interceptions

Tackles

Sacks

Kicking

Field goals made

Field goal percentage

References

Memphis